Arch Rock is a sandstone islet, with an area of 0.44 ha and containing a natural arch, in south-eastern Australia.  It is part of the Partridge Island Group, lying close to the south-eastern coast of Tasmania, in the D'Entrecasteaux Channel between Bruny Island and the mainland.

Fauna
Recorded breeding seabird species are Pacific gull and kelp gull.  The metallic skink is present.

See also
The other islands in the Partridge Island Group:
Charity Island
Faith Island
Hope Island

References

Islands of South East Tasmania